Harley Sanford Jones (November 10, 1902 – December 28, 1997) was a brigadier general in the United States Air Force.

Biography
Jones was born in Fox Lake, Wisconsin, in 1902 and attended Ripon College. He died on December 28, 1997.

Career
Jones originally joined the United States Army Reserve in 1940 before transferring to the Air Corps. During World War II Jones served with the Far East Air Force. Following the war he was assigned to Air Force Materiel Command. In 1951 he was named Chairman of the Boeing B-47 Stratojet Production Committee. His retirement was effective as of June 1, 1957.

References

People from Fox Lake, Wisconsin
Military personnel from Wisconsin
United States Air Force generals
United States Army Air Forces personnel of World War II
Ripon College (Wisconsin) alumni
1997 deaths
1902 births
United States Army Air Forces officers